Eduard Mikhailovich Anisakharov (born 4 July 1983) is a former Russian professional football player.

Club career
He played 4 seasons in the Russian Football National League for FC Neftekhimik Nizhnekamsk.

Personal life
His twin brother Ruslan Anisakharov also played football professionally.

References

External links
 

1983 births
Living people
Russian twins
Twin sportspeople
Russian footballers
Association football midfielders
FC Neftekhimik Nizhnekamsk players